Lieutenant George Willard Furlow (1893-1959) was a World War I flying ace credited with five aerial victories.

Furlow was posted to the 103rd Aero Squadron on 25 July 1918 as a Spad XIII pilot. On 11 August, he shared his first win over a German Albatros two-seater with Edgar Tobin. Over a month later, on 13 September, he shared a double triumph over Fokker D.VIIs with Charles R. d'Olive. He shot down another D.VII four days later, and finished out his victory string on 27 October 1918, when he teamed with Thomas Cassady and another pilot to destroy a Halberstadt reconnaissance machine.

Citations of honors and awards
Distinguished Service Cross (DSC)

The Distinguished Service Cross is presented to George Willard Furlow, First Lieutenant (Air Service), U.S. Army, for extraordinary heroism in action near Charey, France, September 13, 1918. Lieutenant Furlow, while leading a patrol of three monoplace planes at an altitude of 400 meters, met and attacked an enemy patrol of seven monoplace planes. Despite numerical superiority, he destroyed two of the enemy's planes and with the aid of his companions forced the others to withdraw.

Distinguished Service Cross (DSC) Oak Leaf Cluster

The Distinguished Service Cross is presented to George Willard Furlow, First Lieutenant (Air Service), U.S. Army, for extraordinary heroism in action in the region of Vernéville, France, September 17, 1918. Lieutenant Furlow, while on a patrol with two companions, met and attacked an enemy formation of eight planes. In the course of the combat which ensued, Lieutenant Furlow's plane was severely damaged by the enemy's fire. Despite the damage, he continued the attack until he had destroyed one hostile aircraft, and with his patrol forced the remainder of the enemy to retire.

Victory list
Date/time/unit/aircraft flown/aircraft downed/location

- 11 Aug 1918, 1005 103rd SPAD XIII Albatros C.I Flirey
- 13 Sep 1918, 1700 103rd SPAD XIII Fokker D.VII  Charey
- 13 Sep 1918, 1700 103rd SPAD XIII Fokker D.VII  Charey
- 17 Sep 1918, 1620 103rd SPAD XIII Fokker D.VII Vernéville
- 27 Oct 1918, 1500 103rd SPAD XIII Halberstadt C Cumières-le-Mort-Homme

See also

 List of American Aero Squadrons
 List of World War I flying aces
 List of World War I flying aces from the United States

References

Bibliography
 American Aces of World War I. Norman Franks, Harry Dempsey. Osprey Publishing, 2001. , .

1893 births
1959 deaths
Recipients of the Distinguished Service Cross (United States)
American World War I flying aces